Sabine Azéma (born 20 September 1949) is a French stage and film actress and director.

Born in Paris, she graduated from the Paris Conservatory of Dramatic Arts.

Career

Her film career began in 1975. Azéma appeared in A Sunday in the Country (1984), for which she won a César Award for Best Actress, and numerous films of Alain Resnais, including Life Is a Bed of Roses (1983), L'Amour à mort (1984), Mélo (which won her a second César Award for Best Actress), Smoking/No Smoking (1993), On connaît la chanson (1997), Pas sur la bouche (2003), and Cœurs (2006). She has been nominated a further five times.

Filmography

As actress

As director

Decorations 
 Commander of the Order of Arts and Letters (2015)

References

External links

 
 

1949 births
Living people
Actresses from Paris
French film actresses
Best Actress César Award winners
Film directors from Paris
20th-century French actresses
21st-century French actresses
French women film directors
French National Academy of Dramatic Arts alumni
Cours Florent alumni
Commandeurs of the Ordre des Arts et des Lettres